Howick Local Board is one of the 21 local boards of the Auckland Council, and is overseen by the council's Howick Ward councillors.

The board's administrative area includes the suburbs Pakuranga, Howick, Flat Bush, and East Tāmaki, and covers much of east and south-east Auckland.

The board is governed by nine board members, with three elected from each of the boards three sub-divisions. The inaugural members were elected in the nationwide 2010 local elections, coinciding with the introduction of the Auckland Council.

Demographics

2022–2025 term
The board members, elected at the 2022 local body elections in October 2022 are:

2019–2022 term
The board members, elected at the 2019 local body elections in October 2019 are:

2016–2019 term
The 2016–2019 term ran from the 2016 local body elections to the local body elections in 2019. The board members were:

Lucy Schwaner, Vision and Voice - Botany, was elected at the 2016 election but resigned during the first board meeting following the re-election of David Collings as chairperson.

See also 

 Howick Youth Council
 East Auckland
 Howick
 Pakuranga
 Flat Bush

References

Local boards of the Auckland Region